Ellisville is an unincorporated community in Columbia County, Florida.
Coordinates: 29°59'40"N   82°35'27"W. 

Ellisville is the community where Interstate 75 has an interchange with US 41-441.

References

Unincorporated communities in Columbia County, Florida
Unincorporated communities in Florida